White River Junction station is a passenger train station in White River Junction, Vermont, served by Amtrak's Vermonter. It is also used by the Green Mountain Railroad for passenger excursion trains to Thetford and the Montshire Museum of Science in Norwich, Vermont. Originally, it was built in 1937 as a union station that served the Boston and Maine Railroad and Central Vermont Railway. On display adjacent to the station is a sheltered display of Boston and Maine Railroad #494, a historic steam locomotive. The station's historic building is a contributing property in the White River Junction Historic District, which is listed on the National Register of Historic Places. Dartmouth College is five miles to the north in Hanover, New Hampshire.

In earlier decades more trains stopped in the station. The Boston & Maine's Ambassador Boston–Montreal train stopped there, as did the Connecticut Yankee in its years as an longer distance international train from New York City to Quebec City.

References

External links

Amtrak stations in Vermont
White River Junction, Vermont
Railroad museums in Vermont
Museums in Windsor County, Vermont
Stations along Boston and Maine Railroad lines
Former Central Vermont Railway stations
Union stations in the United States
Transportation museums in Vermont
Transportation buildings and structures in Windsor County, Vermont
Railway stations in the United States opened in 1937
Buildings and structures in Hartford, Vermont